
Yitunbulake Town (also Yetimbulak or Qilanbulak) is a town in Ruoqiang County, Bayin'gholin Mongol Autonomous Prefecture in southeastern Xinjiang, People's Republic of China.

Location 

Climate 
Yitumbulak has a cold semi-arid climate, characterised by an extreme aridity. Spring is usually dry and windy, summer sees the majority of rainfall, autumn is mild and cool and winter is dry and cold, with little snow.

 Average annual temperature: 
 Average temperature in January: 
 Average temperature in July: 
 Average annual frost-free period: 150 days
 Average annual sunshine hours: 2647.6 hours
 Total annual radiation: 127.4 kcal/cm2
 Average annual precipitation:

History 
In 1958, as the surrounding area developed mines of coal, lead, zinc and copper, and especially asbestos, a new mining town was created, and on November 5, 1983, the town of Yitunbulake (meaning "lonely spring" in Uyghur) was officially established.

Administrative divisions 
Yitunbulake Town has under its jurisdiction the communities of Yitunbulake and Arjin.

References

Populated places in Xinjiang
Township-level divisions of Xinjiang